Transactions of the Institute of Measurement and Control is a peer-reviewed academic journal that covers the field of measurement and control systems. The editors-in-chief are Frank L. Lewis (University of Texas at Arlington), John O'Gray, Steve Thompson, and Mehmed Önder Efe (Hacettepe University). It was established in 1979 and is published by SAGE Publications on behalf of the Institute of Measurement and Control.

Abstracting and indexing 
The journal is abstracted and indexed in Scopus and the Science Citation Index Expanded. According to the Journal Citation Reports, its 2017 impact factor is 1.579, ranking it 36rd out of 61 journals in the category "Automation & Control Systems" and 32nd out of 61 journals in the category "Instruments & Instrumentation".

References

External links 
 

SAGE Publishing academic journals
Publications established in 1979
English-language journals
Engineering journals